İpek Soylu (born 15 April 1996) is a retired Turkish female tennis player.

In her career, Soylu won three doubles titles on the WTA Tour, her biggest coming at the 2016 year-end Elite Trophy. She also won 12 singles and 18 doubles titles on the ITF Circuit. On 31 October 2016, she reached her best singles ranking of world No. 151. On 17 April 2017, she peaked at No. 63 in the WTA doubles rankings.

Her sole major title as a junior came in 2014, when she partnered Jil Teichmann of Switzerland to win the doubles title at the US Open.

Playing for Turkey Fed Cup team, Soylu has accumulated a win–loss record of 13–10. She has been a member of the Enkaspor tennis team.

Soylu announced her retirement from professional tennis in September 2022.

Personal life and background
Soylu was born on 15 April 1996 in Istanbul and began playing tennis at the age of six. Her favorite shot is forehand, while her favourite surface is clay. Her favorite players were Roger Federer and Li Na.

Career

2016: Success in doubles: Elite Trophy title
In 2016, Soylu won her first three WTA Tour titles, all in the doubles discipline, the biggest coming at the Elite Trophy in Zhuhai where she partnered with Xu Yifan. That year, she also won two other doubles titles, one on home soil at the İstanbul Cup and the other at the Tashkent Open, partnering Andreea Mitu and Raluca Olaru respectively.

That same year, she also made her Grand Slam main-draw debut, after qualifying for the French Open. She drew wildcard Virginie Razzano in the first round and lost to the French veteran, in three sets.

2017

At Wimbledon, Soylu made her first match win at a Grand Slam championship, reaching the second round together with Varatchaya Wongteanchai in which they lost to Chan Hao-ching/Monica Niculescu. In August at the US Open, Soylu lost in the first round to Carla Suárez Navarro.

Significant finals

WTA Elite Trophy

Doubles: 1 (title)

WTA career finals

Doubles: 3 (3 titles)

WTA Challenger finals

Doubles: 1 (runner–up)

ITF Circuit finals

Singles: 21 (12 titles, 9 runner–ups)

Doubles: 29 (18 titles, 11 runner–ups)

Junior Grand Slam finals

Girls' doubles: 1 (title)

References

External links

 
 
 

1996 births
Living people
Sportspeople from Adana
Turkish female tennis players
Enkaspor tennis players
US Open (tennis) junior champions
Grand Slam (tennis) champions in girls' doubles
21st-century Turkish women